The gilbert (symbol: Gb) is an obsolete unit used in practical cgs and CGS-EMU systems to measure magnetomotive force.  The unit is named for English physicist William Gilbert.

Definition:
1 Gb = (1/4π) Bi-turn

Conversion to the corresponding quantity in the SI, with the unit ampere-turn:

1 Gb ≘ (10/4π) A-turn ≈ 0.7957747 A-turn
1 A-turn ≘ 4π × 10−1 Gb

References

Magnetism
Units of measurement
Centimetre–gram–second system of units